Sara Björk Gunnarsdóttir (born 29 September 1990) is an Icelandic professional footballer who plays as a midfielder for Italian Serie A club Juventus FC.

Sara Björk was part of the Iceland women's national football team from 2007 to 2022 and represented her country at the 2009, 2013 2017 and 2022 editions of the UEFA Women's Championship. She is the only woman to have been named the Icelandic Sportsperson of the Year twice, in 2018 and 2020. In August 2020, she became the first Icelander to win the UEFA Women's Champions League.

Club career
Sara Björk joined local team Haukar at the age of six and remained until she was 18. After three subsequent seasons with Breiðablik, she left Iceland in 2011, to sign a three-year professional contract with Swedish club LdB FC Malmö. She was an immediate success in Sweden, contributing 12 goals as Malmö won the Damallsvenskan title. In August 2013 she announced the extension of her Malmö contract for another two and a half seasons via Twitter.

In May 2016, Sara Björk announced that she would not extend her contract with Malmö (now known as FC Rosengård) and planned to leave Sweden after winning four Damallsvenskan titles in five years. At that stage she did not confirm speculation that she was heading for German club VfL Wolfsburg. Shortly afterwards the transfer to Wolfsburg was made official, ahead of their 2016–17 season. In her four seasons with Wolfsburg, the club won the Frauen-Bundesliga and the German Cup each year.

On 1 July 2020, she joined Olympique Lyonnais. On 9 August, she won her first title with the club when it defeated Paris Saint-Germain in the Coupe de France after penalties. On 30 August, she scored one goal in Olympique Lyonnais' 3–1 win against her former club, Wolfsburg, in the UEFA Women's Champions League final.

In December 2020, Sara was named the Icelandic Sportsperson of the Year, becoming the first woman to win it twice. In April 2021, she announced that she was pregnant with her first child. She returned to the pitch in March 2022. In May the same year, she confirmed that she would leave Lyon at the end of the season.

On 1 July 2022, Sara joined Juventus.

International career
Sara Björk was included in Iceland's senior national squad in August 2007, aged 16. She had recovered from an anterior cruciate ligament injury after having to delay surgery because she was too young and her bones were not yet fused.

Still a month short of her 17th birthday, she made her national team debut in a UEFA Women's Euro 2009 qualifying match versus Slovenia in Dravograd. Sara Björk substituted in for Katrín Ómarsdóttir on 87 minutes.

Sara Björk scored twice in Iceland's 3–1 win over Norway at the 2009 Algarve Cup and was selected in the squad for the UEFA Women's Euro 2009 finals in Finland. She played in all three group matches as Iceland were eliminated in the first round.

Women's national team coach Siggi Eyjólfsson selected Sara Björk in the Iceland squad for UEFA Women's Euro 2013, where she played in all four matches including the 4–0 quarter-final defeat to hosts Sweden.

With Margrét Lára Viðarsdóttir on maternity leave, incoming national coach Freyr Alexandersson appointed Sara Björk as Iceland's new team captain in 2014.

Sara Björk limped out of the 2018 UEFA Women's Champions League Final with an injury. She was ruled out of Iceland's match with Slovenia in June 2018, which was the first national team fixture she had missed since 2009.

On 13 January 2023, she announced her retirement from the Icelandic national team.

Personal life
Sara Björk is married to fellow footballer Árni Vilhjálmsson; the couple have a son together.

Career statistics

Club

International 

Scores and results list Iceland's goal tally first, score column indicates score after each Gunnarsdóttir goal.

Honours

Club 
Rosengård
 Damallsvenskan: 2011, 2013, 2014, 2015
 Svenska Cupen: 2015–16
 Svenska Supercupen: 2011, 2012, 2015, 2016

VfL Wolfsburg
 Bundesliga: 2016–17, 2017–18, 2018–19, 2019–20
 DFB-Pokal: 2016–17, 2017–18, 2018–19, 2019–20

Olympique Lyonnais
 Coupe de France: 2019–20
 UEFA Women's Champions League: 2019–20, 2021–22

Individual 
 Sport Person of the Year in Haukar in 2008
 Icelandic Women's Footballer of the Year: 2013, 2015, 2016, 2017, 2018, 2019, 2020
 Icelandic Sportsperson of the Year: 2018, 2020

References

External links

 
 
 
 

1990 births
Living people
Sara Bjork Gunnarsdottir
Sara Bjork Gunnarsdottir
Sara Bjork Gunnarsdottir
FC Rosengård players
Damallsvenskan players
Expatriate women's footballers in Sweden
Expatriate women's footballers in Germany
Sara Bjork Gunnarsdottir
Sara Bjork Gunnarsdottir
Sara Bjork Gunnarsdottir
VfL Wolfsburg (women) players
Women's association football midfielders
FIFA Century Club
Expatriate footballers in France
Juventus F.C. (women) players
Serie A (women's football) players
Expatriate women's footballers in Italy
Icelandic expatriate sportspeople in Italy
UEFA Women's Euro 2022 players
UEFA Women's Euro 2017 players